Siemens Velaro is a family of high-speed electric multiple unit trains built by Siemens and used in Germany, Belgium, France, the United Kingdom, the Netherlands, Spain, China, Russia, and Turkey. The Velaro is based on the ICE 3M/F high-speed trains manufactured by Siemens for the Deutsche Bahn (DB). The Deutsche Bahn were the first to order Siemens high-speed trains; it ordered 13 of these units in 1994, the Nederlandse Spoorwegen (NS) 4 units. The trains were delivered in 1999 for service. The trains were labeled and marketed as the Velaro by their manufacturer, Siemens.

Siemens developed its Siemens Velaro based on the ICE 3M/F. Spain's RENFE was the first to order Velaro trains, known as Velaro E, for their AVE network. China ordered wider versions for the Beijing-Tianjin high-speed rail (China Railways CRH3) and Russia for the Moscow–Saint Petersburg and the Saint Petersburg–Nizhny Novgorod routes (Velaro RUS/Сапсан). Since December 2013, the latest generation, Velaro D has been running in its home country, Germany. An evolution of this version named Velaro Neo shall operate in Germany from December 2022.

In July 2006, a Siemens Velaro train-set (AVE S-103) reached , which was the world record for railed and unmodified commercial service trainsets.

Velaro E (AVE Class 103)

The Velaro E is a version of the Velaro family used by RENFE for operations in Spain. In 2001, RENFE ordered sixteen Velaros designated AVE Class 103. The order was later increased to a total of 26 trains.

The first units were delivered in July 2005 and completed their first test runs in January 2006.

This is a Spanish record for railed vehicles. Until 3 December 2010 it was also a world record for unmodified commercial service trainsets, as the earlier TGV (world record of ) and ICE records were achieved with specially modified and shortened trainsets, and the Shinkansen (1996) record was for a test (non-commercial) trainset.

Velaro CN (CRH3C)

The Velaro CRH3C is a Chinese version of the Velaro. In November 2005, China ordered 60 trains for the Beijing–Tianjin Intercity Railway. The eight-car trains are very similar to Spain's Velaro E, but  wider to fit in almost 50% more seats in a 2 plus 3 layout. In the CRH3C version, a 200-metre-long Velaro train will seat 600 passengers. These trains were manufactured jointly by Siemens in Germany and CNR Tangshan in China. The first Chinese-built CRH3C was unveiled on 11 April 2008.

CRH3C reached a top speed of  during a test on the Beijing to Tianjin high-speed railway on 24 June 2008.

Velaro RUS (RZD Sapsan)

The Velaro RUS is part of the Velaro family built for Russia. On 19 May 2006, Siemens announced an order from Russian Railways for eight Velaro RUS high-speed trains including a 30-year service contract. The contract is in total worth €600million. They are also built to the  Russian track gauge, unlike other Velaro EMUs, which are standard gauge.

Four of the trains are for both 3 kV DC and  operation.

Development and construction were carried out at Erlangen and Krefeld in Germany. Single-voltage EVS1 (3 kV DC) trains entered passenger service at the end of 2009 on the Moscow–St Petersburg route, and the dual-system EVS2 trains entered service on the Nizhniy Novgorod route in 2010.

On 19 December 2011 an order for an additional eight sets was signed in order to facilitate an increased number of services on existing lines and the expansion of new service elsewhere in the system.

Velaro D (DB Class 407)
The Velaro D is specifically designed for Deutsche Bahn international services from Germany. There are fire-proof equipment rooms and fire doors between cars. Velaro D is designed to be quieter and more reliable than the ICE 3 (Class 403/406).

The train is also expected to use up to 20% less energy than previous versions of ICE. This is achieved in part by improved body styling. It does not have the ICE3's panorama lounge where passengers in the end coaches can see the tracks over the driver's shoulder. The Class 407 has 460 seats: 111 in first class, 333 in second class and 16 in the bistro car. In total this is 37 more seats than the ICE 3, even though the seat pitch is unchanged. This is achieved by putting the traction equipment in compartments at either end of the train instead of hiding it behind panels the length of the train. Unlike all previous ICE versions, the passenger seating is all open-plan and there are no compartments.

The eight-coach Class 407 trains can couple up and work with their Class 403 and Class 406 predecessors. Eight of the 16 bogies per train are powered, and there are four independent sets of traction equipment per train: if two of them break down, the train can still run. For full international flexibility across Europe, it can function on any of four voltages. The fleet will be based in Frankfurt.

In December 2008 Deutsche Bahn signed a €500million order for 15 trainsets. The train's production stages were presented to the press in Krefeld on 28 April 2010, and three completed cars were displayed by Siemens on 22 September 2010 at InnoTrans. In June 2011, Deutsche Bahn ordered an additional Velaro D set (increasing the total to 16) in order to replace an ICE3MF set damaged in an accident in August 2010.

Velaro D was meant to go into service starting December 2011 on services from Frankfurt to southern France via the new LGV Rhin-Rhône, and subsequently within Germany and on other international services to France, Belgium, Switzerland and the Netherlands. Due to a series of delays in manufacturing and licensing no Velaro D trainsets were in service as of November 2012 and there was no schedule for their delivery. Only in December 2013 the first four trains delivered to DB were licensed for domestic operation as multiple units and started with passenger traffic. Four more trains were due to be delivered in spring 2014, whereas the remainder of eight trains shall be used for test runs in France and Belgium to gain type approval there.

The specification of the Velaro D allows its access to the Channel Tunnel, enabling DB to use it on the services it plans to operate from London to Amsterdam and Frankfurt. Deutsche Bahn submitted safety documentation for the operation of Velaro D high speed trainsets through the Channel Tunnel to the Intergovernmental Commission in July 2011, which in June 2013 granted a licence for passenger trains to DB.

In 2012 and 2013, Siemens discussed with Deutsche Bahn the delivery of one more Velaro D set, free of charge, as compensation for the delivery and certification delays. This train was originally built for test purposes and features a different propulsion setup, utilizing permanent magnet AC synchronous motors as opposed to the traditional AC asynchronous motors. Siemens stated that this will allow a reduction in the number of propulsion units per train, while still maintaining train performance.

Velaro MS (DB class 408) 

Demanding a proven model Deutsche Bahn ordered 30 Velaro MS for delivery starting in 2022. The first of the trains called ICE 3neo by Deutsche Bahn and classed as 408 was completed in late 2021 and presented to the public in February 2022. At the same time the order was increased by 43 trainsets, with all 73 trains supposed to be in service by early 2029.

Velaro e320 (Eurostar)

On 7 October 2010, it was reported that Eurostar had selected Siemens as preferred bidder to supply ten Velaro e320 trainsets at a cost of €600million (and a total investment of more than £700million with the refurbishment of the existing fleet included) to operate an expanded route network, including services from London to Cologne and Amsterdam. On the British system they are classified as Class 374 units.

Velaro TR (TCDD HT80000)

The Velaro TR is a Velaro D derived eight-car standard gauge high-speed train for the Turkish State Railways (TCDD).

In 2013, TCDD concluded three contracts with Siemens for the acquisition of 17 units in total (one unit for the first, six for the second and ten for the last contract) with a combined value of €685million. Furthermore, Siemens would provide 7 years of maintenance and cleaning, and also provide a simulator. The Velaros are to be deployed on the Turkish high-speed railway network. The first Siemens Velaro (the only Velaro D type train of TCDD, code numbered HT80001) entered service on 23 May 2015 between Ankara-Konya. The second Velaro of TCDD, which is the first Velaro TR type train, with the code number HT80101 (this type of train was involved an accident in Ankara) arrived in Ankara on 17 February 2016.

Unlike the traditional white - red - dark blue color scheme used on the TCDD HT65000 high-speed trains, a white - turquoise - grey color scheme has been selected for the livery of TCDD's Velaro trains.

Velaro Egypt 
In May 2022 it was announced that Egyptian National Railways had ordered 41 Velaro eight-car sets, amongst other railway equipment, for a  railway development.

Velaro Novo 
The Velaro Novo is Siemens's concept for the next generation of high speed train. It was announced in June 2018, and the first sets could be in service in 2023.

Gallery

See also
 Bombardier Zefiro
 Alstom AGV
 CAF Oaris
 List of high-speed trains

References

External links

 Velaro Background
 Velaro Sell Sheet; archived
 Updated Velaro Sell Sheet (2014)
 Velaro E specification sheet; download, archived
 Siemens Velaro RUS Sell Sheet
 Velaro CN Data Sheet; archived
 Velaro developmental history and technical details Siemens Page
 Velaro D Technical details Siemens Page
 More Velaro D Tech details (Includes TE curve graph)
 Velaro e320 technical specifications 
 Interactive 360° virtual tour of the Velaro E 

 
High-speed trains
Velaro
Proposed British rail vehicles
Train-related introductions in 1999
15 kV AC multiple units
1500 V DC multiple units
25 kV AC multiple units
3000 V DC multiple units